Comedy Ka Daily Soap is a comedy show that aired on Sony Entertainment Television from 16 August 2010 to 7 October 2010. The show was hosted by Krushna Abhishek. The show consisted of parodies and mimicries of famous celebrities.

Cast
 Krushna Abhishek (Host)
 Bharti Singh
 Sudesh Lehri
 Kapil Sharma
 Parvati Sehgal 
 Rohit Khurana
 Paresh Ganatra
 Sooraj
 VIP
 Rajeev
 Salooni
 And many other actors from "Chota Parda", from Hindi dramas.

References

Sony Entertainment Television original programming
Indian comedy television series
2010 Indian television series debuts
2010 Indian television series endings
Television series by Optimystix Entertainment
Indian television sketch shows